Anny Ogrezeanu (born 24 February 2001 in Bonn) is a German Romanian singer. In 2022, they won the twelfth season of The Voice of Germany.

Life 
Anny Ogrezeanu grew up in Wachtberg near Bonn. Ogrezeanu is non-binary and uses they/them pronouns.

Ogrezeanu is a volunteer in Ahr Valley which was severely damaged in the flood of 2021.

Career 
In 2022, Ogrezeanu auditioned for the talent show The Voice of Germany. In the blind auditions they performed "I Will Always Love You" and chose Mark Forster as their coach. In the next phase, the "battles", Ogrezeanu sang "(I've Had) The Time of My Life" and together with their battle partner they performed the famous Dirty Dancing lift. They continued on to the next round, the sing-offs, where they sang Emeli Sandé's "Clown". In the semi-finals Ogrezeanu delivered their version of "Not About Angels" by Birdy and was chosen (with a majority of 65.4%) by the audience to represent Forster's team in the finals. In the finals, Ogrezeanu performed "Friday I'm in Love" with their coach Forster and "Daddy's Eyes" with Zoe Wees. In the overall voting Ogrezeanu won The Voice of Germany with 41.61%. Upon winning the show Ogrezeanu performed and released a duet version of "Run with Me" with Calum Scott.

Discography

Singles

References

External links 

 Anny Ogrezeanu on Instagram

German singers
Non-binary musicians
The Voice (franchise) winners
2001 births
Living people